Martine Tabeaud (born 1951) is a French geographer and climatologist. Since 1977, she has been teaching at University of Paris 1 Pantheon-Sorbonne.

Biography
Born in 1951, Tabeaud holds a DESS in remote sensing and studied at Institut national de l’information géographique et forestière. In 2019, she was appointed co-director of the International Geography Festival (FIG). Her work appeared in Liberation.

Bibliography 
 La climatologie générale, Armand Colin, 2008. ISBN 9782200354237
 "L’Établissement Al-Assad, ferme d’État sur l’Euphrate avant la liquidation en 2000 : quelques effets pervers d’une approche de développement top‑down", Méditerranée, 119; 2012

References 

1951 births
Living people
French climatologists
French geographers